Cottonwood Cove is situated at the banks of Lake Mohave on the Nevada-Arizona border in Clark County, Nevada, United States. It stands just 13.1 miles (21 kilometers) and 23 minutes east of Searchlight, 12.5 miles (20 kilometers) north of Laughlin and an hour away from Las Vegas.  It is the site of the Cottonwood Cove Resort and Marina. The cove is part of the Lake Mead National Recreation Area administered by the U.S. National Park Service. The desert lake is approximately 67 miles long and is backed by the Davis Dam on the Colorado River.

Fish species

 Rainbow
 Largemouth Bass
 Striped Bass
 Crappie
 Sunfish
 Catfish (Channel)
 Carp

External links
Cottonwood Cove Resort and Marina
Arizona Boating Locations Facilities Map
Arizona Fishing Locations Map
Where to Fish in Arizona Species Information
Arizona Lake Levels

Historic American Landscapes Survey in Nevada
Populated places in the Mojave Desert
Unincorporated communities in Clark County, Nevada
Unincorporated communities in Nevada
Lake Mead National Recreation Area